Andrakovo is a rural locality (a village) in Sidorovskoye Rural Settlement, Gryazovetsky District, Vologda Oblast, Russia. The population was 21 as of 2002.

Geography 
Andrakovo is located 29 km northwest of Gryazovets (the district's administrative centre) by road. Moshennikovo is the nearest rural locality.

References 

Rural localities in Gryazovetsky District